FiveSprockets was a web-based software company based in San Diego, California, United States focused on developing resources, social networking, and web-based collaborative software for scriptwriting, filmmaking and digital-video production.  The name FiveSprockets came from the five phases, or sprockets, of media production: (1) Story Development & Scriptwriting; (2) Pre-production; (3) Production; (4) Post-production; and (5) Marketing & Distribution.  Founded in 2007 by CEO Randy Ullrich, FiveSprockets launched its Beta Release in September 2008 with an initial focus on social networking, educational content, and web-based software for screenwriting and production management.

Ideas Module
FiveSprockets included an Ideas module where creators could store their raw ideas across several different Idea types (such as Story or Character).

vScripter
vScripter was FiveSprockets' web-based story-development and scriptwriting software.  vScripter took a story-development perspective on the process and allows the writer(s) to collect metadata about each story and manage their stories.  vScripter supported a variety of different media-project formats, including screenplay, TV Sitcom, TV drama, Stage Play, Audio / Radio Play, and Comic Book.

 Editor - vScripter's scriptwriting editor included features typical of scriptwriting software such as (a) proper formatting as recommended by AMPAS  Nicholl Fellowship in Screenwriting; (b) writing accelerators such as intelligent tab-and-enter key processing; and (c) character and location memory for auto-completion typing.
 Story Metadata - vScripter stored metadata about the story, including Log line, Tagline, Treatment, and story notes.
 Collaboration - The script's originator could selectively choose to share a script in read-only or write-access mode to any of the originator's contacts.
 Import/Export - Scripts written in other applications could be imported into vScripter via the RTF standard, which typically preserved most (but not necessarily all) of the original script's formatting.  Additionally, vScripter could export to RTF, PDF, and HTML.
 Script Registration - Through a partnership with ProtectRite, the creator and pioneer of online intellectual-property registration, writers could access the ProtectRite service directly from within vScripter to register and protect their work.

vProductionOffice
vProductionOffice was FiveSprockets' web-based production-management software.

 Script Breakdown - When the user Greenlights a production, vProductionOffice walked the user through a simple wizard that, among other things, created a script breakdown.  This includes separating the various scenes, listing the characters needed in each scene, and marking the 1/8's of each scene.   The scenes could then be scheduled for their shooting date.
Storyboarding - The Storyboard feature allowed the user to create storyboards for each scene in the breakdown and watch the storyboard in an animation viewer.
Casting and Crewing - The user could cast and crew the production from their various connections within FiveSprockets.

Job Board
FiveSprockets included a Job Board so that its users could seek out new collaborators across a variety of media-production roles, from "Above the Line" positions such as Actor, Director, and Producer, to "Below the Line" roles such as Line Producer, Script Supervisor, and Key Grip.

Social networking and community
FiveSprockets included social networking features such as user profiles, project showcasing, contact building, internal messaging, and discussion boards.  FiveSprockets also included educational content and resources where users could share their knowledge and learn from others across content types like how-to videos, instructional guides, discussion forums, and glossary elements.

Closure
On the 2nd of November 2012 the site shut down. Anyone attempting to access the site is met with the following message:

After four years as a web service, FiveSprockets.com shut down on Friday, 2 November 2012, at 9pm Pacific Standard Time in the USA (Midnight Eastern Standard Time).

Thank you to all of our supporters, in your various capacities, over the last several years. There are plenty of other good services out there, so we think you can find a home. If nothing else, try good old Google Docs. Keep writing and keep creating. And never be discouraged because, in the wise words of William Goldman, "Nobody knows anything." Except maybe you.
Sincerely,
Randy
Founder, FiveSprockets

See also
 Web 2.0
 Web application 
 Social network service
 Filmmaking
 Screenplay
 Scriptwriting
 Screenwriting
 List of screenwriting software

References

External links
 FiveSprockets - Official site
 ThemeIt - Official site

Web applications
Social networking services
Screenwriting software
Companies based in San Diego
Online mass media companies of the United States
Film production software
Privately held companies based in California